The 2000 season was São Paulo's 71st season since club's existence. That year the club won state league of São Paulo, the Campeonato Paulista for the twentieth time after two legs of final against rival Santos thanks to a win in the first match by 1–0 and a 2–2 draw in the second leg, both played in Morumbi Stadium. In Copa do Brasil The Dearest reaches the finals for the first time but couldn't raise the trophy due to a defeat in second match when Geovanni, midfielder of Cruzeiro, scored a free kick goal on the last minute and gave to opponent the title. Another highlighting performances were in Torneio Rio-São Paulo and Copa dos Campeões when São Paulo fell in semi-finals. Playing the continental cup Copa Mercosur they not took a place in second stage ending in second position on group stage. In national league Campeonato Brasileiro, the team was defeated by rival Palmeiras in round of 16 by two results (1–1 Away; 1–2 Home).

Scorers

Overall

{|class="wikitable"
|-
|Games played || 78 (8 Torneio Rio-São Paulo, 20 Campeonato Paulista, 12 Copa do Brasil, 4 Copa dos Campeões, 6 Copa Mercosur, 26 Campeonato Brasileiro, 2 Friendly match)
|-
|Games won || 42 (4 Torneio Rio-São Paulo, 14 Campeonato Paulista, 8 Copa do Brasil, 2 Copa dos Campeões, 2 Copa Mercosur, 10 Campeonato Brasileiro, 2 Friendly match)
|-
|Games drawn || 18 (0 Torneio Rio-São Paulo, 4 Campeonato Paulista, 2 Copa do Brasil, 1 Copa dos Campeões, 1 Copa Mercosur, 10 Campeonato Brasileiro, 0 Friendly match)
|-
|Games lost || 18 (4 Torneio Rio-São Paulo, 2 Campeonato Paulista, 2 Copa do Brasil, 1 Copa dos Campeões, 3 Copa Mercosur, 6 Campeonato Brasileiro, 0 Friendly match)
|-
|Goals scored || 161
|-
|Goals conceded || 110
|-
|Goal difference || +51
|-
|Best result || 5–1 (H) v Uralan Elista – Friendly match – 2000.1.18 5–1 (H) v Rio Branco – Campeonato Paulista – 2000.3.22
|-
|Worst result || 1–5 (A) v Vitória – Campeonato Brasileiro – 2000.10.7
|-
|Top scorer || França (40)
|-

Friendlies

Constantino Cury International Tournament

Official competitions

Torneio Rio-São Paulo

Record

Campeonato Paulista

Record

Copa do Brasil

Record

Copa dos Campeões

Record

Copa Mercosur

Record

Copa João Havelange (Campeonato Brasileiro)

Record

External links
official website 

Brazilian football clubs 2000 season
2000